Clarkenia is a genus of moths belonging to the family Tortricidae.

Species
Clarkenia basilinea  Razowski & Becker, 2001
Clarkenia cantamen  Razowski & Becker, 2002
Clarkenia miramundi  Razowski, 1988
Clarkenia nivescens  (Meyrick, 1926) 
Clarkenia pantherina Razowski & Wojtusiak, 2009
Clarkenia superba  Razowski, 1988
Clarkenia triangulifera Razowski & Wojtusiak, 2008

References

 , 2005: World Catalogue of Insects vol. 5 Tortricidae.
 , 1988, Acta Zoologica Cracoviensia 31: 406
 , 2002: Black and white forewing pattern in Tortricidae (Lepidoptera), with descriptions of new taxa of Neotropical Euliini. Acta zoologica cracoviensia 45 (3): 245-257. Full article:  
 , 2009: Tortricidae (Lepidoptera) from the mountains of Ecuador and remarks on their geographical distribution. Part IV. Eastern Cordillera. Acta Zoologica Cracoviensia 51B (1-2): 119-187. doi:10.3409/azc.52b_1-2.119-187. Full article: .

External links
tortricidae.com

Euliini
Tortricidae genera
Taxa named by Józef Razowski